Bort is an industrial-grade shard of diamonds.

Bort may also refer to:
Bort (Habkern), a settlement in the municipality of Habkern, Bern, Switzerland
Bort (name), including a few people with the surname
Bort, two one-time characters from The Simpsons episode "Itchy & Scratchy Land"
Bort, an Orbot from Mighty Orbots
AS Bort, a team in the 1930–31 French Rugby Union Championship
  is a cultivar of Karuka

See also
Bort-les-Orgues, a town in France